Zephyr Books were published by The Continental Book Company, a subsidiary of the Swedish Bonnier Group, from 1942 to 1950. The imprint took its name from the Greek god of the western wind, indicating its speciality.

During World War II no books in English could be imported into Sweden. The Continental Book Company was established in 1942 with the object of publishing books in English in Stockholm. The intended market comprised Sweden and other parts of the European continent where it was possible to sell English books in spite of the war, namely Switzerland, Portugal and Turkey.  Considerable quantities of Zephyr Books were also exported to Hungary, Italy, occupied Denmark and the non-occupied zone of France.

After the war it was decided to continue, and even expand, the series. The intention was to replace the English book series published by Tauchnitz before the war. The total destruction of the Leipzig book industry made it clear that Tauchnitz would not be able to start work again for some
time. Sweden, on the other hand, had its means of production intact and abundant supplies of paper.

Publication was extended as fast as the continental market was reopened for freer trade, and the number of volumes was doubled within a year. The series was given a distinctive note by its "special volumes", such as its anthologies of prose and verse, and an edition of Lewis Carroll's "Alice in Wonderland" with illustrations by Mervyn Peake, which appeared as a Zephyr Book in 1946, two years before it was published in London.

Soon, however, competition from British and American publishers became too strong, and the publication of the Zephyr series ended in 1950. By then 167 volumes had been published.

The covers were colour-coded depending on the content: red for modern American authors, blue for modern English authors, green for classics, yellow for detective fiction and thrillers, grey for anthologies and special volumes, light blue for poetry and drama, and purple for memoirs and biographies.

List of Zephyr Books

External links
Zephyr Books - detailed essay and list by a collector of the series

Book publishing companies of Sweden
Swedish books
Series of books